Slaven Bačić (born 1965) is a Serbian Croat legal historian and lawyer, and the current president of the Croat National Council of Serbia.

Biography 

Slaven Bačić was born in 1965 in Subotica.

In 1988 he graduated from the University of Novi Sad Faculty of Law. In 1992 he earned his master's degree from the Faculty of Law in Belgrade. In 2002, he obtained his PhD from the Faculty of Law in Osijek, Croatia.

He works as a lawyer in Subotica since 1994.

References 

Croats of Vojvodina
Writers from Subotica
Members of the Croat National Council (Serbia)
1965 births
Living people